Kathleen Blake "Kit" Coleman (born Catherine Ferguson, 20 February 1856 – 16 May 1915) was an Irish-Canadian newspaper columnist. Coleman was the world's first accredited female war correspondent, covering the Spanish–American War for the Toronto Mail in 1898. Coleman also served as the first president of the Canadian Women's Press Club, an organization of women journalists.

Early life
Kit Coleman was born Catherine Ferguson to Patrick and Mary Ferguson (née Burke) in May 1856 at Castleblakeney, County Galway, her birth is often listed incorrectly as 1864 presuming her maiden name is Blake. Her father was a middle-class farmer. Catherine was educated at Loretto Abbey in Rathfarnham and a finishing school in Belgium. As an adult, she recalled her parents influencing her love of creative activities; her father had given her his love of books, and her mother, who was blind, taught her an appreciation of music and to also how to play several instruments. The strongest influence on her intellectual life came from her uncle Thomas Nicholas Burke, a Dominican priest and a renowned liberal and orator, who taught her religious and social tolerance, an attitude that was reflected in her journalism as an adult.

Coleman married young to an elderly man and wealthy landowner Thomas Willis, the sources conflict stating either at age 16 or 20, a man 40 years her senior, under her adopted name Kathleen Blake. The couple had one child who died in early childhood, and Willis died soon after. The marriage had not been a happy one, resulting in her disinheritance by her husband's family. She emigrated to Canada as a young widow in 1884. In Canada, she worked as a secretary until she married her boss, Edward Watkins. She lived in Toronto and Winnipeg, where she bore two children (Thady and Patricia) by her second husband.

In 1889, following the death of Watkins, or more probably, their divorce, Coleman first turned to cleaning houses to support herself and her two children, then began writing articles for local magazines, mainly Toronto's Saturday Night.

Journalist
Kathleen Blake Watkins then moved to Toronto to pursue journalism in 1890. As "Kit of the Mail", she was the first female journalist to be in charge of her own section of a Canadian newspaper. She was hired by the Toronto Mail (later the Mail and Empire). In the 1890s and early 1900s, she ran a seven-column page in the Toronto Mail. Called "Woman's Kingdom," it came out once a week. She began by writing articles on lighter topics typical of the women's columns that had begun to appear in newspapers at that time, topics such as theatre criticism, as well as fashion notes and recipes. In one of her most popular features she gave the first advice to the lovelorn. She rebelled against her editors’ assumptions that women were interested only in housekeeping, fashion, and her advice column, and insisted on writing about other things she believed would interest them: politics, business, religion, and science. Her column was so outspoken that it attracted a wide following, including Canadian Prime Minister Wilfrid Laurier. Her columns also covered topics such as social reform and women's issues, examining controversies like domestic violence and the poor working conditions women endured. Kit Coleman's columns were syndicated to newspapers across Canada. She worked for the Mail until 1911.

Kathleen Blake Watkins increasingly began to write columns covering areas in the mainstream news, and soon became one of the Mails star reporters. In 1891 she interviewed the celebrated French actress Sarah Bernhardt, who was performing in Canada. She was a special correspondent for Toronto Mail during the World's Fair, Chicago, 1893; the Mid-winter Fair, San Francisco, 1894; British West Indies, 1894; and Queen Victoria's Diamond Jubilee, London, 1897. Her reputation grew internationally, and in 1894 an American reference work called her writing "brilliant" and noted that no woman journalist, and possibly no male below the rank of editor-in-chief, had a more direct influence on the prestige and circulation of any North American newspaper.

Covering the Spanish–American War in Cuba

During the Spanish–American War of 1898, Kathleen Blake volunteered to go to Cuba to cover the battle activity at the front. The Toronto Mail sent her to Cuba, exploiting the opportunity to garner sensationalist publicity. However, she was told by her supervisors to write features and "guff," as she called it, not the news from the front, apparently believing that this would not be appropriate for a woman. She received her war correspondent accreditation from the United States government, thus becoming the first accredited woman war correspondent in the world.

She was authorized to accompany American troops, but was vehemently opposed by other correspondents and the military authorities, who nearly succeeded in keeping her stranded in Florida. Blake persevered and arrived in Cuba in July 1898, just before the end of the war. Her accounts of the aftermath of the war and of its human casualties were the peak of her journalism career and made her famous. On her way back to Canada, Kathleen stopped in Washington where she addressed the International Press Union of Women Journalists.

Later career
Upon her return from Cuba, Watkins married Theobald Coleman and moved to Copper Cliff, Ontario, where her husband was company doctor for the Canadian Copper Company. In 1901 the Colemans moved to Hamilton, Ontario.

In 1904, in order to fight discrimination against women in the journalism profession, she helped establish the Canadian Women's Press Club, and was named its first President. Notwithstanding her own pioneering work as a journalist in an overwhelmingly male profession, as well as her activist writing on many women's rights topics, Coleman did not publicly endorse feminism and women's suffrage until 1910. Many other woman journalists, including her Mail and Empire colleague Katherine Hale (Amelia Beers Warnock), viewed Coleman as a pioneer and a role model, and the suffragists among them hoped that she would become an activist for the women's suffrage cause. Coleman's political ambivalence came partly because of the editorial position of the Toronto Mail and Mail and Empire; both newspapers were adamantly opposed to it. Coleman also felt unsure about the extent to which women – and "objective" journalists – should become involved in politics.

Coleman was also a poet and published books of poetry.

Death and legacy
Coleman contracted pneumonia and died on 16 May 1915, in Hamilton, Ontario.

There is a Kathleen Blake "Kit" Coleman fonds at Library and Archives Canada. The archival reference number is R2590, former archival reference number MG30-C152. The fonds covers the date range 1925 to 1981. It consists of 60 centimeters of textual records, 91 photographs and 2 medals.

In 2023, the Royal Canadian Mint released both a silver dollar and a 99.99% pure gold coin to commemorate the 125th anniversary of her status as North America's first accredited female war correspondent.

See also

 Women journalists
 War correspondent

References

1856 births
1915 deaths
19th-century Irish people
19th-century Canadian journalists
20th-century Canadian journalists
20th-century Irish people
19th-century Canadian women writers
20th-century Canadian women writers
People from County Galway
Canadian columnists
Canadian women non-fiction writers
Canadian newspaper reporters and correspondents
Irish emigrants to Canada
People of the Spanish–American War
Women in war in Canada
Canadian women journalists
Irish women columnists
Canadian women columnists
Persons of National Historic Significance (Canada)
Canadian expatriates in Cuba